Norwalk station is a below-grade light rail station on the C Line of the Los Angeles Metro Rail system. It is located in the median of Interstate 105 (Century Freeway), below Interstate 605 (San Gabriel River Freeway) in the city of Norwalk, California, after which the station is named. It is currently the eastern terminus of the C Line.

The original name for the station was I-605/I-105 for its location but was later changed to Norwalk.

This station serves as a major transfer point in the Metro system. From the station, Metro Express route  offers service to the Disneyland Resort and Knott's Berry Farm in Orange County, Express route  provides service to both El Monte Station and California State University, Long Beach.

One of the major criticisms of the C Line is that it doesn't extend to Metrolink's Norwalk/Santa Fe Springs station,  to the east. The gap creates a major inconvenience for anyone wanting to take rail transit between Orange County or the Inland Empire and western Los Angeles County. Norwalk Transit route 4 connects the two stations, but the trip takes 15 to 25 minutes, and travel times can be longer because of times between buses or traffic.

Service

Station layout

Hours and frequency

Connections 
, the following connections are available:
 Long Beach Transit: 172, 173
 Norwalk Transit: 2, 4, 5, 7

Future plans
There have been persistent proposals for a  eastward extension of the Los Angeles Metro C/K Line from its current terminus at Norwalk Station to reach the Norwalk/Santa Fe Springs station, serviced by Metrolink. This project carries a proposed cost of $321 million for an aerial bridge, and a $360 million cost for a subway. Since an initial Environmental Impact Review (EIR) in 1993, there has been no solid progress for this proposal. The Los Angeles County Metropolitan Transportation Authority (Metro) 2009 Long Range Transportation Plan (LRTP) lists funding priorities to build through year 2040 – the C Line east extension is not a funded project in the Metro's 2009 LRTP and is instead in the Tier 1 Strategic Unfunded Plan.

Station artwork

The station has a bee theme, a nod to the indigenous place names for Norwalk, Sejat, Sejatngna and Sehat, which meant “Place of the Bees.”

Artist Meg Cranston used this historical reference as her inspiration to create her artworks collectively called “Suka: Place of the Bees.” The art pieces include a large bee sculpture for the entry to the parking lot, smaller bee sculptures are beneath the station canopies, a bee motif silkscreened onto the elevator glass, honeycomb pattern (hexagonal) wall tiles and paving patterns, and bronze tiles on the platform reference ancient coins which featured the honeybee.

References

C Line (Los Angeles Metro) stations
Railway stations in the United States opened in 1995
Norwalk, California
1995 establishments in California